Novotavlarovo (Yañı Tawlar) is a rural locality (a village) in Tavlarovsky Selsoviet, Buzdyaksky District, Bashkortostan, Russia. The population was 269 as of 2010. There are 2 streets.

Geography 
Novotavlarovo is located 41 km northwest of Buzdyak (the district's administrative centre) by road. Starotavlarovo is the nearest rural locality.

References 

Rural localities in Buzdyaksky District